Oakland Southwest Airport  is a county-owned public-use airport in Oakland County, Michigan, United States. It is located one nautical mile (1.85 km) southwest of the central business district of New Hudson. The airport is uncontrolled, and is used for general aviation purposes.

It is included in the Federal Aviation Administration (FAA) National Plan of Integrated Airport Systems for 2017–2021, in which it is categorized as a local reliever airport facility.

History 
The airport opened in 1946 and was formerly known as New Hudson Airport and was originally used for veterans to get their pilot licenses under the G.I. bill. It was acquired by Oakland County in August 2000.

Facilities and aircraft 

It has one runway, designated as runway 08/26. It has an asphalt surface and measures 3,128 by 40 feet (953 x 12 m).

For the 12-month period ending December 31, 2021, the airport had 13,140  aircraft operations, an average of 36 per day. They are composed entirely of general aviation. At that time, there were 43 aircraft based at this airport: 41 airplanes, 40 single-engine and 1 multi-engine, and 2 helicopters.

The airport has a fixed-base operator that offers fuel, hangars, courtesy and rental cars, conference rooms, a crew lounge, and more.

References

External links 
 Aerial photo as of 10 April 2002 from USGS The National Map
 

Airports in Michigan
Transportation in Oakland County, Michigan
Buildings and structures in Oakland County, Michigan